Sayyid Muhammad-Husayn Muhammad-Ali Nasrallah (born May 17, 1951) is an Iraqi judge, prosecutor, and served as the president of Court of Appeal for four different Iraqi provinces. He retired in May 2014. He is currently a Law Representative for Pillsbury Global in Iraq and the chief of the Nasrallah family.

Early life and education 
Nasrallah was born on May 17, 1951, to Muhammad-Ali Nasrallah and Monira Tumah. Both of his parents hail from the noble Al Faiz family, and claim agnatic descent from Muhammad's daughter Fatimah and her husband, Ali, the first Shia Imam. Nasrallah was born in Karbala, and grew up there. He is the eldest of six children. His ancestors on some occasions ruled the city, and held custodianship of its holy sites. His brother, Haidar was executed by the Baathist regime in 1989.

Education 
He moved to Baghdad in the late 1960s, and graduated with a bachelor's degree in law and politics in 1972 from the University of Baghdad. He was conscripted into the military after he graduated from university, and appointed as a legal soldier, serving for just under two years. Nasrallah then worked as a judicial investigator in 1973, until he joined the Judicial Institute of Iraq in 1977 to become a judge. He graduated as a judge from the institute in 1979. He also graduated in supreme specialised studies from the same institute in 2000.

Nasrallah was awarded with a certificate from the United Nations during a Convention on the Prevention and Punishment of the Crime of Genocide course in 2003.

Under a grant from the British Department for International Development, Nasrallah travelled, along with 139 other Iraqi judges, to Prague, to attend the Judging in a Democratic State course at the CEELI Institute. He attained a diploma from the institute in 2004. He also holds a diploma in Law Enforcement attained in Verbania, in 2005.

Career 
On June 19, 1979, the republican decree was issued appointing judges for that year, and Nasrallah was among those assigned, yet he was reluctant to assume his role. This was due to the civil laws in Baathist Iraq that clashed with Islamic laws and values. Hence, he ended up seeking Muhammad-Baqir al-Sadr in Najaf, and managed to get a religious decree allowing him to do so, with guidance on how to work the role, without violating his religious values. 

Nasrallah participated in the 1991 uprising by supporting the rebels, and was eventually suspected by the Baathists and so was sent away from his hometown to work in cities in the north and south of Iraq.

Mayoralty and Custodianship 
Shortly after the 2003 invasion of Iraq, a governance committee was formed to run Karbala, and so the members nominated Nasrallah as the new mayor that would replace Tali al-Douri. However Nasrallah turned down the city's request as he was focused on his career. Nasrallah was then assigned as a custodian of the Imam Husayn shrine, until a secretary general was appointed by Ayatollah Sistani, as part of the constitutional transition of the shrines' management from the sidana to the Shi'i Endowment Office. However, Nasrallah remained on the shrine's management board until January 14, 2014.

Court of Appeal 
The Court of Appeal is the highest judicial and administrative body in Iraq. The head of the court is considered to be the head of justice in the province and a member of the Supreme Judicial Council. On October 20, 2003, Nasrallah was assigned as vice president of the Court of Appeal of Babil. A year later he became the president of the Court of Appeal of Wasit, and a member of the Supreme Judicial Council. In 2005, he established the Court of Appeal in Karbala and was assigned as its president. Two years later, he became the president of the Court of Appeal of al-Muthanna, until 2011.

Judicial Supervisory Authority 
In 2011, he became a member of the Judicial Supervisory Authority of the Supreme Judicial Council. Nasrallah was responsible for monitoring the conduct of the judges and the staff in the courts of Babil, Wasit, Najaf and al-Qadissiyah. He remained a member of the commission, until he retired on May 27, 2014.

Technocratic Nomination 
In 2016, Muqtada al-Sadr attempted to form a technocratic government along with Haider al-Abadi. For this campaign, Nasrallah was nominated as Minister of Justice, considering his political independence, and honourable reputation. However, due to the political chaos in Iraq, the plans for the government were not followed through.

Works 
Nasrallah has produced three law studies:

 The Obligatory Will: In Law and Jurispuridence (1987)
 Laws of Absence (1993)
 Protesting and Appealing Laws in Absentia (1999)

The result of the first two studies caused amendments in the Iraqi Law of Personal Status.

Personal life 
Nasrallah is married and has four children. His son Ali, teaches Computer Science at the University of Karbala.

See also 

 Judiciary of Iraq
 Medhat al-Mahmoud
 Al Faiz family

References 

People from Karbala
20th-century Iraqi judges
Living people
1951 births
Custodian of the Imam Husayn Shrine
21st-century Iraqi judges